Sander Drange Heieren (born 23 October 1998) is a Norwegian handball player for TTH Holstebro and the Norwegian national team.

He represented Norway at the 2022 European Men's Handball Championship.

Individual awards
 All-Star Goalkeeper of REMA 1000-ligaen: 2020–21

References

1998 births
Living people
Norwegian male handball players
People from Sande, Vestfold
Sportspeople from Vestfold og Telemark